Les Grands Ballets Canadiens de Montréal (GBCM) is a ballet company based in Montreal, Quebec, Canada. A creative and repertory company, it performs works that reflect the diverse trends of contemporary ballet.

History
Les Grands Ballets Canadiens de Montréal was founded in 1957 by Ludmilla Chiriaeff. Conductor and composer Michel Perrault served as the organization's first music director.

Since its creation, Les Grands Ballets has performed a broad range of dance, ranging from classics to major contemporary work. Under the direction of Chiriaeff and Fernand Nault (1965–1973), Brian Macdonald (1974–1977) and Lawrence Rhodes (1990–1999), the institution fostered the development of such notable artists as James Kudelka, Édouard Lock and Ginette Laurin.

In 1981 the company participated alongside the National Ballet of Canada, the Royal Winnipeg Ballet, le Groupe de la Place Royale, the Danny Grossman Dance Company, the Toronto Dance Theatre, Winnipeg Contemporary Dancers and the Anna Wyman Dance Theatre in the Canadian Dance Spectacular, a dance show at Ottawa's National Arts Centre which was filmed by the National Film Board of Canada for the 1982 documentary film Gala.

In 2000, Gradimir Pankov became Artistic Director. A native of Macedonia, Pankov previously served as Artistic Director of Nederlands Dans Theater II (Netherlands), the National Ballet of Finland (Helsinki), the Cullberg Ballet (Sweden), and Ballet du Grand Théâtre de Genève (Switzerland).

In 2017, Ivan Cavallari became the artistic director of les Grands Ballets. Born in Italy, he trained at Teatro alla Scala Ballet School in Milan. Before becoming artistic director of les Grands Ballets, he was artistic director of the West Australian Ballet and then the Ballet de l'Opéra national du Rhin. The ballet masters are Hervé Courtain, appointed in 2017, and Marina Villanueva Arias, appointed in 2020.

The company has commissioned work from some of the world's most prominent choreographers: The Queen of Spades by Kim Brandstrup; The Butterfly Effect by Shawn Hounsell;  Between Ashes and Angels by Adam Hougland; Noces, Cinderella and The Rite of Spring by Stijn Celis; The Little Prince, Possibly Six and TooT by Didy Veldman;  The Beast and the Beauty by Kader Belarbi;  Four Seasons by Mauro Bigonzetti; Minus One and Danz by Ohad Naharin; Rodin/Claudel by Peter Quanz; and Re–II by Shen Wei.

Its repertoire also includes major acquisitions by such artists as Mats Ek, Jiří Kylián, Jean-Christophe Maillot and Christopher Wheeldon, along with works by young creators like Stephan Thoss, Didy Veldman and Peter Quanz. In 2008 Gradimir Pankov established the national choreographic contest, won by Jean-Sébastien Couture, which has allowed Les Grands Ballets to showcase work by emerging Canadian choreographers. Each season, Les Grands Ballets invited international companies to perform as part of its program; the list includes Houston Ballet, Royal Winnipeg Ballet, Alvin Ailey® American Dance Theater, Cullberg Ballet (Sweden), Compañía Nacional de Danza (Spain), Warsaw Ballet (Poland), Cloud Gate Dance Theatre (Taiwan), Shen Wei Dance Arts (New York City), Ballet de l’Opéra de Lyon (France), Dutch National Ballet and Eifman Ballet Theatre of St-Petersburg (Russia).

Since Ivan Cavallari took artistic leadership, the company focuses on extending its repertoire to both showcase the great ballet classics and acquire new works by emerging contemporary creators.

Dancers

Dancers for the 2022-2023 season:

Principal Dancers
 Raphaël Bouchard

 Rachele Buriassi
 Roddy Doble
 Vanesa Garcia-Ribala Montoya
 Maude Sabourin
 Myriam Simon
 Yui Sugawara

First Soloists

 Célestin Boutin
 Emma Garau Cima
 Anna Ishii
 Anya Nesvitaylo
 Esnel Ramos

Soloists

 Mai Kono
 Sahra Maira
 Stephen Satterfield
 Andre Santos

Demi-soloists

 Kiara DeNae Felder
 Graeme Fuhrman
 Jose Carlos Losada Morales
 Hamilton Nieh
 Éline Malègue

Corps de ballet

 Antoine Benjamin Bertran
 Bernardo Betancor
 Giuseppe Canale
 Bernard Dubois II
 Alexandra Eccles
 Kiara Flavin
 Maude Fleury
 François Gagné
 Étienne Gagnon-Delorme
 Sofía González
 Enno Kleinehanding
 Tatiana Lerebours
 James Lyttle
 Carrigan MacDonald
 Tetyana Martyanova
 Felixovich Morante
 Stefano Russiello
 Théodore Poubeau
 Catherine Toupin
 Angel Vizcaíno

Apprentice

 Oscar Lambert
 Christian Scifo
 Calista Shepheard
 Rose Trahan

Former principal dancer

 Rachel Rufer (2000-2010)
 Geneviève Guérard (1999-2006)

Former soloists

 Edi Blloshmi
 Hervé Courtain
 Émilie Durville
 Lénaïg Guégan (2007-2010)
 Marcin Kaczorowski
 Isabelle Paquette (2001-2010)
 Guillaume Pruneau (2002-2010)
 Jeremy Raia
 André Silva

Notable people
 
 
Iro Tembeck, faculty

References

External links
 Les Grands Ballets website
 Les Grands Ballets Canadiens, Productions Internationales Albert Sarfati 

Ballet companies in Canada
Performing arts in Montreal
Performing groups established in 1957
1957 establishments in Quebec